I've Got You is the third album by vocalist Gloria Gaynor released in 1976. It was her first on Polydor Records, which had absorbed her previous label MGM Records and soon became a force in the disco genre. The album charted in the US Billboard at #107 in the US Pop chart and at #40 in the US R&B chart.

History
I've Got You features the megamix by Tom Moulton, a 19-minute disco suite with the songs "Let's Make a Deal", "I've Got You Under My Skin" and "Be Mine." The songs from the Soul based side two of the album includes "Touch of Lightning", "Let's Make Love", "Nothing in This World" and "Do It Right."

The album was remastered and reissued with bonus tracks in 2015 by Big Break Records.

Track listing

Personnel
Gloria Gaynor – vocals
Allan Schwartzberg, Jimmy Young – drums
Bob Babbitt – bass guitar
Lance Quinn, Jerry Freidman, Jeff Mironov – guitar
Pat Rebillot – keyboards
Carlos Martin – congas
Bongi – dishpan drums
Alan Rubin, Pat Russo – trumpet
Dave Taylor, Wayne Andre, Barry Rodgers – trombone
Lou DelGatto, George Taylor, Larry Combs – reeds
Peter Gordon, Jimmy Buffington – French horns
The Tony Posk Strings – strings
Linda November, Arlene Martell, Vivian Cherry – background vocals (Simon Said on "I've Got You Under My Skin")

Production
Meco Monardo, Tony Bongiovi, Jay Ellis – producers
Tom Moulton – mixing
Mecco Menardo, Lance Quinn, Charlie Callelo, Harold Wheeler, Brad Baker, Lou DelGatto – arrangers
Mecco Menardo – vocal arrangements
Tony Bongiovi, Bob Halsall, Bob Valicenti – engineers
José Rodriguez – mastering
Joe Williams – cover photography

References

External links
 

1976 albums
Gloria Gaynor albums
albums arranged by Charles Calello
Albums produced by Tony Bongiovi
Polydor Records albums